Torsten Konrad Löwgren (1903 – 1991) was a Swedish painter, born in Gävle. He studied at Lennart Berggrens målarskola in Stockholm, and at the Royal Swedish Academy of Arts. He painted landscapes from Stockholm and its surroundings.

Paintings
 On the beach (På stranden), 1931, 29.5x40 cm, Oil/paper
 Street Scene in the Snow, 1931, 47x54 cm, Oil/canvas
 Standing female Nude in a Shower, 1929, 37.1x23.9 cm, Oil/panel
 Vintrig Dalgång, 1941, 50x50 cm, Oil/panel

References

1903 births
1991 deaths
20th-century Swedish painters
Swedish male painters
20th-century Swedish male artists